Michael James Bailey (born 6 April 1988) is an English former actor. He is best known for playing the role of Sid Jenkins in the first two seasons of the British teen drama Skins.

In 2017, Bailey left his acting career and became a teacher.

Career
In the Skins series 1 finale, Bailey sang a musical ensemble version of "Wild World" by Cat Stevens. He, along with the rest of the main cast of series 1 and 2, did not return for the third series.

He also appeared in the Channel 4 drama 1066: The Battle for Middle Earth as Tofi, which was broadcast in May 2009.

In March 2012, he filmed in Birmingham We Are the Freaks, a teen comedy directed by Justin Edgar and produced by Alex Usborne at 104 Films, which was released in 2013.
He is now a Drama teacher in Bedminster Down School.

Personal life
He was married on 27 June 2015. After Bailey's last project in 2017, he completed a drama degree and completed teacher training, and now works as a Secondary school drama teacher.

Filmography

References

External links

 

1988 births
Living people
Male actors from Bristol
English male television actors
English male singers
Schoolteachers from Bristol